J. N. Reddy may refer to:

J. N. Reddy (engineer), Indian-American engineer
JN Reddy (politician), South African politician